Correlator may refer to:

 Correlation function (quantum field theory)
 An optical correlator
 A radio correlator
 A leak noise correlator
 A correlation function (probability)

See also
 Cross-correlation